Parakh may refer to:

 Parakh (1937 film), a 1937 Bollywood film
 Parakh (1944 film)
 Parakh (1960 film)
 Parakh (1981 film), a 1981 Bollywood film starring Simple Kapadia
 Parakh (1978 film), a 1978 Pakistani Urdu film